Batman: The Brave and the Bold – The Videogame is a 2010 video game based on the comic book character Batman and the television cartoon series Batman: The Brave and the Bold. It was developed by WayForward Technologies and distributed by Warner Bros. Interactive Entertainment. It was released on September 7, 2010, for the Wii and Nintendo DS, and is the only non-Lego Batman video game released for those platforms.

Gameplay
Batman: The Brave and The Bold – The Videogame is a side-scroller beat 'em up/platformer with 2D animated visuals based on those of the cartoon series. Each level is presented as an episode and features Batman teaming up with one of several superheroes, including Hawkman, Robin, Green Lantern and Blue Beetle, to stop various supervillains. Players have access to several gadgets and can also summon another Jump-In Hero to perform a powerful attack. As the enemies are defeated, coins can be collected. They can be used to upgrade the various gadgets, making them more powerful.

The Nintendo DS version is a single-player game in which the player switches control between Batman and the available hero, using each of their abilities to progress through each level. Players with both versions of the game can control Bat-Mite in the Wii version via Nintendo DS connectivity.

Development
The video game was developed under the direction of Adam Tierney, while working closely with Warner Bros. Animation. When pitching the idea to Warner Bros., they framed it as a 'playable cartoon'. The intent was to replace extended cut-scenes with exhaustive dialogue in lieu of over 400 pages of quips and gags, and the occasional plot beat, that played out during the gameplay.

Reception

The games received mixed to slightly positive reviews. GameRankings gave the game a score of 73% for the Wii version and 74% for the DS version; while Metacritic gave it a score of 70 out of 100 for the Wii version and 74 out of 100 for the DS version.

IGN gave the Wii version a score of 6.5, saying it is too repetitive for $40, while the DS version received a score of 7.5, saying "it won't last long, but it's satisfying." 1UP.com gave the Wii version a B+ rank, saying "while it errs a bit too much toward simplicity, The Brave And The Bold is a great family-friendly Batman game." GameSpot gave the Wii version a 7, calling it entertaining, if lacking challenge. GameTrailers gave the game a score of 7.5. GameSpot also awarded this game an award for "Best Use of a Creative License" in 2010.

References

External links 
 
  (Wii)
  (Nintendo DS)

2010 video games
Action-adventure games
Batman video games
Batman: The Brave and the Bold
Beat 'em ups
Nintendo DS games
Side-scrolling video games
Video games based on animated television series
Video games scored by Jake Kaufman
Video games developed in the United States
Wii games
Detective video games
Warner Bros. video games
Multiplayer and single-player video games
Superhero video games
Video games based on adaptations
Video games set in the United States
Video games set in London
Video games set in Atlantis
Video games set on fictional islands
Games with Wii-DS connectivity
WayForward games